Zhang Xiyan(April 22, 1980 in Harbin, Heilongjiang ) is the most successful female Chinese amateur and professional boxer. As of July 2010, Zhang has won a gold medal at the 2002 Women's World Amateur Boxing Championships in the Bantamweight (54 kg), and Zhang turned professional in 2005, and won WBA and WIBA world titles in 2006 and 2007. Zhang claimed China's first professional boxing world champion.

References

1980 births
Living people
Sportspeople from Heilongjiang
People from Harbin
Sportspeople from Harbin
Chinese women boxers
Bantamweight boxers
AIBA Women's World Boxing Championships medalists
21st-century Chinese women